Himayat Sagar is an artificial lake about  from Hyderabad in the Ranga Reddy district of Telangana, India. It lies parallel to a larger artificial lake Osman Sagar. The storage capacity of the reservoir is 2.9 tmc ft.

History 
The construction of reservoirs on the Esi, a tributary of the Musi River, was completed in 1927, with the intention of providing a drinking water source for Hyderabad and protecting the city from floods, which Hyderabad suffered in 1908. It was built during the reign of the last Nizam of Hyderabad, Nizam VII and is named after his youngest son Himayat Ali Khan.

The Himayat Sagar dam and Osman Sagar reservoirs provided continuous water supply to the twin cities of Hyderabad and Secunderabad until recently. Due to population growth, they are not sufficient to meet the cities' water supply-demand.

The engineer at the time of construction was late Khaja Mohiuddin, son of Mohammed Hussein, Madri.

The descendent of the royal family of the Nizam, Himayat Ali Mirza, has recently joined the “save Osmansagar and Himayatsagar” movement as he believes that these reservoirs are iconic landmarks of Hyderabad and still act as a lifeline for lakhs of people of the old city. He also urged the CM of Telangana to withdraw the proposal of GO 111. 

Since GO 111 had been scrapped, Himayat feared that many parts of the city might be affected by floods even with small summer rains. Also, it would increase the illegal construction activities near the lake, ultimately increasing the threat of flooding.

References

External links

 https://timesofindia.indiatimes.com/city/hyderabad/himayatsagar-may-be-left-high-and-dry-by-2036/articleshow/61541422.cms
 https://www.thehansindia.com/news/cities/hyderabad/hyderabad-himayat-osman-sagars-hold-capacity-despite-heat-wave-686311?infinitescroll=1

Tourist attractions in Hyderabad, India
Reservoirs in Telangana
Lakes of Hyderabad, India